Regiella insecticola is a species of bacteria, that lives as a symbiont of aphids. It shows a relationship with Photorhabdus species, together with Hamiltonella defensa. Together with other endosymbionts, it provides aphids protection against parasitoids.

References

Enterobacteriaceae